Talk to the People is an album by pianist Les McCann recorded in 1972 and released on the Atlantic label.

Reception

Allmusic gives the album 4 stars, stating: "Although there are some weak links in this chain of tunes, the highs are sky-high, and they represent some of McCann's peak studio performances."

Track listing 
All compositions by Les McCann except as indicated
 "What's Going On" (Renaldo Benson, Al Cleveland, Marvin Gaye) – 7:28
 "Shamading" – 3:41
 "Seems So Long" (Stevie Wonder) – 3:04
 "She's Here" – 5:54
 "North Carolina" – 9:20
 "Let It Lay" (Les McCann, Rev. Bee) – 5:22
 "Talk to the People" – 9:16

Personnel 
Les McCann – piano, vocals
Keith Loving – guitar
James Rowser – bass
Donald Dean – drums
Buck Clarke – percussion
The Persuasions (track 1), Eugene McDaniels (tracks 3, 6 & 7), Susan McDaniels (tracks 3, 6 & 7), Sister Charlotte (tracks 3, 6 & 7), Billy Barnes (tracks 3, 6 & 7), Joel Dorn (tracks 3, 6 & 7) – background vocals

References 

Les McCann albums
1972 albums
Atlantic Records albums
Albums produced by Joel Dorn